JHR Developments is a motor racing team based in Dronfield, Derbyshire, in the United Kingdom. The team was founded in 1995, to enter Jamie Hunter in the UK and European Formula Renault series.

It currently participates in the F4 British Championship certified by FIA - powered by Ford and BRDC British Formula 3 Championship.

In addition the team's current participations, in the past the team was active in many British racing series including the Ginetta Juniors, Ginetta Supercup, Renault Clio Cup, MGF Cup, Porsche Supercup, Formula Renault Championship, Britcar, and the Seat Cupra Championship, amongst others.

Current series results

F4 British Championship

†Bolger drove for Carlin until round 9.

Formula 4 UAE Championship

F4 Spanish Championship

† Lisle drove for Drivex School in round 1.

BRDC British Formula 3 Championship / GB3 Championship

† Simmons and Marzorati also drove for Chris Dittmann Racing.

‡ Hedley drove for Elite Motorsport prior to round 5.

Timeline

References

External links
 

British auto racing teams
Auto racing teams established in 1995
1995 establishments in England
British GT Championship teams
Porsche Carrera Cup Great Britain teams